James Forsyth (1827–1910) was a Scottish sculptor, best remembered for various fountains designed for William Ward, 1st Earl of Dudley (1817–1885) at Witley Court, Worcestershire, England, and in the town of Dudley. He was born in Kelso, Scotland, a son of Adam Forsyth, a mason.

Notable works

Fountains, Witley Court

Two immense fountains at Witley Court were designed by William Andrew Nesfield and executed by James Forsyth and his brother William Forsyth, who were carrying out sculpture in the house and the church. They survived the fire and subsequent despoliation of the house. The largest, the Perseus and Andromeda Fountain, has been restored to working order by English Heritage.

Triumphal Arch Fountain, Dudley

A grade II structure designed by James Forsyth in 1867 and presented to the town of Dudley by the 1st Earl of Dudley. A triumphal arch ornamented with sculpture in the Flamboyant Italian Renaissance style, including heraldic dolphins and heraldic demi-sea horses, topped with female figure below a large cornucopia.

Family
He is the father of James Nesfield Forsyth (1864-1942) a noted sculptor.

Sources
James Forsyth

References

Scottish male sculptors
1827 births
1910 deaths